Orenda may refer to
 Orenda, a spiritual concept
 The Orenda, a novel
 Orenda Engines, a Canadian aircraft engine manufacturer, or several of their engine models 
 Orenda Iroquois engine
 Orenda OE600
 Orenda J79
 Orenda Fink, an American musician
 Orenda/SP-26 Historic District, Chopawamsic RDA Camp 3, a recreational demonstration camp